The Painter of the Vatican Mourner was an Attic black-figure vase painter, active in the middle of the sixth century BC and closely connected with the artists of the E Group. His real name is not known. His name vase is in the Vatican Museum and depicts a mourning woman standing before the nude body of a dead man on a bed of straw. There is no consensus on the interpretation of the scene. Eos and Sarpedon have been suggested, as have Oinone and Paris. John Boardman describes him as a thoughtful but sometimes inprecise artist.

Bibliography 
 John Beazley: Attic Black-Figure Vase-Painters, Oxford 1956, p. 140
 John Boardman: Schwarzfigurige Vasen aus Athen. Ein Handbuch, Mainz 1977, p. 70

References

External links 
 The Vatican vase

Ancient Greek vase painters